Ali Azmat (born 1 January 1979) is a Pakistani first-class cricketer who played for the Lahore cricket team.

References

External links
 

1979 births
Living people
Pakistani cricketers
Lahore cricketers
Cricketers from Lahore